1992 J.League Cup Final was the 1st final of the J.League Cup competition. The final was played at National Stadium in Tokyo on November 23, 1992. Verdy Kawasaki won the championship.

Match details

See also
1992 J.League Cup

References

J.League Cup
1992 in Japanese football
Tokyo Verdy matches
Shimizu S-Pulse matches